Chydarteres octolineatus is a species of beetle in the family Cerambycidae. It was described by Thunberg in 1822.

References

Trachyderini
Beetles described in 1822